Zemplínska Široká is a village and municipality in Michalovce District in the Kosice Region of eastern Slovakia. The village was previously named Rebrin from 1920 to 1960.

History
In historical records the village was first mentioned in 1266.

Geography
The village lies at an altitude of 103 metres and covers an area of 9.182 km².
It has a population of 871 people.

Ethnicity
The population is about 96% Slovak, 4% Gypsy in ethnicity.

Government
The village has its own birth registry office.

Culture
The village has a small public library, and a football pitch.

Economy
The village has a food store.

The nearest railway station is at Michalovce 6 kilometres away.
The municipality has a total of 269 houses.

Gallery

See also
 List of municipalities and towns in Michalovce District
 List of municipalities and towns in Slovakia

External links

https://web.archive.org/web/20070513023228/http://www.statistics.sk/mosmis/eng/run.html

Villages and municipalities in Michalovce District
Villages in Slovakia merged with other villages